Cherry Potter is a film writer, cultural commentator and psychotherapist.

She is the author of three film books:
 Image, Sound and Story, the art of telling in film (Secker and Warburg, 1990), 
 Screen Language: From writing to film making (Methuen, 2001), 
 I Love You But…Seven Decades of Romantic Comedy (Methuen, 2002), 

She also writes on film, culture and relationships for The Guardian.

References

External links

Living people
Year of birth missing (living people)
Alumni of the Royal College of Art
British journalists
British screenwriters
British television writers
British non-fiction writers
British women television writers